Kadri Göktulga (1904 – 25 October 1973) was a Turkish football player who played for Fenerbahçe and the Turkey national football team. Born in İstanbul, he played as a left back and left midfielder.

Career
Göktulga played 198 matches and scored 6 goals for Fenerbahçe between 1921 and 1931, winning three Istanbul League Championships and the General Harington Cup He played 10 times for the national team, and was a member of Turkey's team at both the 1924 and 1928 Summer Olympics.

From 1970 to 1971 he sat on the board of Fenerbahçe.

Honours
Istanbul Football League
Winner - 1920-21, 1922–23, 1929–30
General Harington Cup
Winner

References

External links
Profile @ TFF.org
Kadri Göktulga's profile at Sports Reference.com

1904 births
1973 deaths
Footballers from Istanbul
Turkish footballers
Turkey international footballers
Association football defenders
Fenerbahçe S.K. footballers
Olympic footballers of Turkey
Footballers at the 1924 Summer Olympics
Footballers at the 1928 Summer Olympics